The Cowboy from Sundown is a 1940 American Western film directed by Spencer Gordon Bennet and written by Roland Lynch and Robert Emmett Tansey. The film stars Tex Ritter, Roscoe Ates, Carleton Young, George Pembroke, Patsy Moran and Pauline Haddon. The film was released on May 9, 1940, by Monogram Pictures.

Plot

Cast           
Tex Ritter as Tex Rockett
Roscoe Ates as Gloomy Day
Carleton Young as Nick Cuttler
George Pembroke as Cylus Cuttler 
Patsy Moran as Prunella Wallaby
Pauline Haddon as Bee Davis 
Glenn Strange as Bret Stockton
Slim Andrews as Judge Hank Pritchard 
Bud Osborne as Pronto Parsons
Joe McGuinn as Rip Carter
Dave O'Brien as Steve Davis
Chick Hannan as Pete 
Tris Coffin as Ben Varco

References

External links
 

1940 films
1940s English-language films
American Western (genre) films
1940 Western (genre) films
Monogram Pictures films
Films directed by Spencer Gordon Bennet
American black-and-white films
1940s American films